Melville Leroy James (28 January 1900 – 20 October 1975) was an Australian rules footballer who played with Melbourne in the Victorian Football League (VFL). Originally from Golden Point in the Ballarat Football League, it was expected that South Melbourne would recruit James, but in what was described as a "triumph" by the Football Record, the Melbourne secretary, Andrew Manzie, signed him instead. He was cleared to Essendon in 1926, but never played a senior match for the Bombers.

Notes

External links 

1900 births
Australian rules footballers from Victoria (Australia)
Melbourne Football Club players
Golden Point Football Club players
1975 deaths